Radio Televisyen Malaysia (abbreviated as RTM, stylised as rtm), also known as the Department of Broadcasting, Malaysia is the national public broadcaster of Malaysia. Established on 1 April 1946 as Radio Malaya, it is the first and the oldest broadcaster in the country. After Malaysia was formed on 16 September 1963, Radio Malaya was renamed Radio Malaysia. On 28 December the same year, television service in Malaysia began with the establishment of Televisyen Malaysia. In 1969, Radio Malaysia and Televisyen Malaysia merged to form the present-day broadcast department. Radio Televisyen Malaysia monopolised the free-to-air television until 1984 and radio until 1988, when private television and radio stations such as TV3 and Best FM begin to exist. Currently, it operates 6 television channels and 34 radio stations nationwide.

History

The birth of local broadcasting, 1921 to 1946 
History of local broadcasting in Malaysia began in 1921 when an electrical engineer from the Johor Government, A.L. Birch, brought the first radio set into British Malaya. He then established the Johor Wireless Association in 1923 and commenced broadcasting through 300 meter waves. Similar associations were also established in Penang (Penang Wireless Association) in 1925 and in Kuala Lumpur (Malayan Wireless Association) in 1928.

In 1930, Sir Earl from the Singapore Port Authority commenced its short wave broadcast every fortnight either on Sundays or Wednesdays. The same effort was emulated by the Malayan Wireless Association, broadcasting from Bukit Petaling, Kuala Lumpur, via 325 meter waves. Penang Wireless Association led by Khoo Sian Ewe launched Station ZHJ – Malaya's first radio station on 24 August 1934, which operates out of George Town, Penang. British Malaya Broadcasting Corporation (BMBC) was formed on 21 July 1935 and awarded a broadcasting license by the British crown on 1 June 1936 as a radio network. On 1 March 1937, Sir Shenton Thomas opened the BMBC Studio and its transmitter at Caldecott Hill in Singapore. The Corporation was taken over by the Straits Settlements Government in 1940, subsequently nationalised and reorganised as the Malaya Broadcasting Corporation and was placed under the British Department of Information.

During World War II in 1942, the Imperial Japanese Army occupied British Malaya and used the existing radio channels in Penang, Malacca, Kuala Lumpur, Seremban and Singapore to transmit Japanese propaganda. Malaya Broadcasting Corporation was renamed Syonan Hoso Kyoku ('Light of the South' Broadcasting Corporation), the local counterpart to the Japan Broadcasting Corporation (Nippon Hoso Kyokai, NHK for short). Meanwhile, the Radio Station in Penang was renamed Penang Hoso Kyoku (Penang Broadcasting Corporation). After the war, the British came back into power and reclaimed the radio station, with the station managed by the interim government – British Military Administration (BMA).

Early history, 1946 to 1969 
On 1 April 1946, Radio Malaya was established at Caldecott Hill in Singapore. Apart from its headquarters in Singapore, it also had broadcast stations in cities and towns across Malaya such as Penang, Kuala Lumpur, Seremban and Malacca. Radio Malaya consists of five language services – Malay, Aslian, English, Chinese and Tamil language, the latter three became known as the Blue, Green and Red Networks in 1959. Blue, Green and Red Networks were also used to refer to regional stations and programmings and radio broadcastings were done using amplitude modulation (AM) or short and medium wave transmissions during those times.

In the British Crown Colonies of North Borneo (now Sabah) and Sarawak, Radio Sarawak was launched on 7 June 1954, while Radio Sabah was launched on 9 November 1955 after test broadcast since 1952. These two radio stations offers language services in Malay, Chinese and English, in addition to the native languages of Iban for Sarawak and Kadazan for Sabah.

With the independence of Malaya on 31 August 1957, Radio Malaya was split into two separate stations: the original studios in Singapore were taken over by a new station called Radio Singapura and Radio Malaya moved to Kuala Lumpur going on air from the new location – the 5th to 6th floor of the Federal House on 1 January 1959. It would be later renamed Radio Malaysia on 16 September 1963, with the transmissions beginning with its trademark words Inilah Radio Malaysia (This is Radio Malaysia) on the day the Malaysia of today, a federation which consists of the States of Malaya, Sabah, Sarawak and Singapore (until 1965) was born. On the same day, Radio Sabah, Radio Sarawak and Radio Singapura became part of the Radio Malaysia network as state stations for Sabah, Sarawak and Singapore listeners respectively. Radio Malaysia's flagship international shortwave radio service, Voice of Malaysia (VOM) was launched on 15 February the same year to promote the country, with three languages in the beginning: English, Mandarin and Indonesian.

Television services under the name Televisyen Malaysia or Malaysia Television (Malaysia TV) started on 28 December 1963 in time for the national New Year celebrations in Kuala Lumpur and regional telecasts in the Klang Valley in Selangor state, with its first studios being located in Jalan Ampang. The then 10-month-old Television Singapura (launched on 15 February 1963) became part of Televisyen Malaysia in January 1964 as its state station for Singapore viewers, a role served until 1965, when Singapore became independent. During its time as part of Malaysia, Singapore like its three other partners–Sabah, Sarawak and Malaya had its own radio network, but it was the only state to have its own television network. The state's radio and television broadcast right were included as an annex in the Malaysia Agreement, which it garnered autonomy in this area, among others.

Upon joining Radio Malaysia, Radio Sabah consisted of two language networks: the main Malay language network and the Blue Network for Kadazan, Murut, Dusun, Bajau, English and Mandarin language. Radio Sarawak on the other hand, consisted of four language networks: the main Malay language network, the Blue network for Bidayuh language, the Green network for Iban and Kayan/Kenyah languages and the Red network for English, Mandarin, Bisaya and Murut language programming.

Merger and expansion of Radio and TV operations, 1969 to 2001 
Radio and TV operations merged on 11 October 1969 as the new Angkasapuri headquarters was inaugurated. Thus Radio Malaysia and Televisyen Malaysia's identities merged to become Radio Televisyen Malaysia, abbreviated as RTM. A second TV station opened on 17 November in the same year as its rebranding. On 19 April 1971, Radio Malaysia's Malay language unit became the first radio station to broadcast 24 hours a day nationwide, thus becoming National Network in the process. On 5 November 1973, RTM launched a radio station named Radio Ibu Kota (Capital City Radio) specifically for the capital city of Kuala Lumpur. On 20 June 1975, Radio Malaysia's first Stereo FM format radio station went on the air, mainly broadcast pop music and initially focus on the Klang Valley area.

By 31 August 1978, Voice of Malaysia had expanded its broadcast to include 5 other language services namely Thai (1 January 1972), Arab (1 November 1972), Tagalog (22 October 1973), Burmese and Malay. On 17 April 1995, an international Islamic service called Voice of Islam was added to the Voice of Malaysia network and broadcasts in English and Malay Languages. All language services were transmitted from Kajang, Selangor, except for Tagalog service which was transmitted from Tuaran, Sabah.

Following the construction of earth satellite station near Kuantan, Pahang and Kinarut, Sabah for communications and television broadcast via the Indian Ocean Intelsat III satellite, TV1 was introduced to viewers in the Bornean states of Sabah and Sarawak on 30 August 1975. RTM began broadcasting in colour since 28 December 1978 in Peninsular Malaysia and 31 August 1980 in East Malaysia. TV1 was the first channel to broadcast in colour, followed by TV2 on 7 May 1979. RTM used to have a third TV station solely for Sabah which was launched on 28 December 1971. However, it ceased to air by mid-1985 after TV2 made its debut in East Malaysia on 31 August 1983. Between 1972 and 1999, Televisyen Malaysia shared time with TV Pendidikan – the national education channel in the daytime. TV1 introduced daytime transmissions on 1 March 1994, thus resulting in TV Pendidikan ceased broadcasting on TV1, while TV2 introduced daytime transmissions in 2000. 

Apart from its headquarters at Angkasapuri, RTM has branches in every state of Malaysia (except Selangor which is based in Angkasapuri) and the Federal Territory of Labuan. In addition to managing radio stations, RTM state branches also publish shows and news content for television broadcast. The Peninsular States began to have their own state radio stations by the early 1990s, with Perlis being the last to do so on 1 June 1991. In East Malaysia, the territorial radio station of Labuan was established on 31 August 1986. RTM began to gradually replace Amplitude Modulation broadcast with Frequency Modulation broadcast since the 1980s and adopted numbering system for its Radio Stations in 1993. The names of the radio stations were as follows:
 Radio 1 Malay language service
 Radio 2 Music service, rebranded from Stereo FM.
 Radio 3 Local services, with the name format of Radio 3/Radio Malaysia followed by place name in Malay language.
 Radio 4 English language service
 Radio 5 Chinese language service
 Radio 6 Tamil language service
 Radio 7 Aslian language service
Original Malay Melody Radio service (RiMA), precursor of present-day Radio Klasik began broadcast on 11 April 1998.

Radio rebranding and TV digitalisation, 2001 to present 
In conjunction with its 59th anniversary on 1 April 2005, RTM's radio stations underwent rebranding and renaming.
 Radio 1 Malay language service was rebranded as Nasional FM.
 Radio 2 Music service was rebranded as Muzik FM.
 Most Radio 3 Local service radio stations adopted names based on place names in Malay language followed by FM. Sabah's non-Malay language service was rebranded as Sabah V FM, while Sarawak's English and Chinese language and Bumiputera language services were rebranded as Red FM and Wai FM respectively.
 Radio 4 English language service was rebranded as Traxx FM.
 Radio 5 Chinese language service was rebranded as Ai FM.
 Radio 6 Tamil language service was rebranded as Minnal FM.
 Radio 7 Aslian language service was rebranded as Asyik FM.
 Original Malay Melody Radio service was rebranded as Klasik FM.

On 12 August 2006, Nasional FM merged with Klasik FM to form Klasik Nasional FM, and broadcast classical Malay music together with its main program 24 hours a day. However, the merger survived for only five years, as the station began losing listeners to sister stations and private competitors such as Hot FM, Sinar FM and Era FM, as well as then-upstart Bernama's Radio24 which took over the frequencies of Klasik FM. Thus, Klasik Nasional was demerged on 4 January 2012 at midnight and split into the original two radio stations, with Nasional FM using the same frequencies as the former Muzik FM (discontinued in late 2012) and Klasik Nasional became Radio Klasik. Owing to the diminished effectiveness of a shortwave radio service over time with changing technology and media consumption habits, Voice of Malaysia was dissolved on 31 August 2011.

TV1 broadcast overnight many times since the early 1990s, but daily 24-hour transmissions did not come until 2003, which was later cancelled. Permanent 24-hour broadcasting was introduced on 3 April 2006 on TV2 and on 21 August 2012 on TV1. Three new TV channels were launched during the digital television broadcasting era: TV Okey on 21 March 2018, News channel Berita RTM on 25 June 2020 and Sports channel Sukan RTM on 1 April 2021. TV Pendidikan returned to RTM on 6 April 2020 and began to air on TV Okey.

Director-General of RTM
Mr. Jackson (1946–1955)
Mr David Little (1955–1959)
Mr Albert Read (1959–1969)
Tan Sri Dato Dol Ramli (1969–1975)
Abdullah bin Mohamad (1975–1986)
Dato' Zain bin Mahmood (1986–1987)
Dato' Jaafar bin Kamin (1988–1999)
Dato' Ali Musa bin Sulaiman (1999–2003)
Dato' Abd Rahman bin Hamid (2003–2009)
Datuk Ibrahim bin Yahya (2009–2011)
Dato' Norhyati binti Hj Ismail (2011–2014)
Dato' Haji Abu Bakar bin Ab. Rahim (2014–2018)
Tuan Haji Abdul Muis bin Shefii (2018–2019)
Puan Nor Yahati Awang (2020)
Datuk Ruzain bin Idris (2021)
Dato' Haji Che Roslan bin Che Daud (2022)
Suhaimi Sulaiman (2023)

Headquarters and branch offices

Terrestrial stations

Radio stations 
RTM offers 34 FM radio channels – 6 national and 28 local stations, which are collectively known as Radio RTM or Radio Malaysia. Each station has different frequencies, depending on the area of coverage.

Nationwide

Local 
RTM's local radio network, formerly known as Radio 3, offers localised services to listeners across their respective states and federal territories. Most stations operate from 6:00 am to midnight daily, with simulcasts of Nasional FM taking place during downtime. Others like Sabah V FM, take simulcasts from another national radio network overnight. KL FM, as well as Sarawak FM, however, operates 24 hours a day. The logos of the local radio stations display colours that match those on Malaysia's individual state or territory flags.

Regional radio stations

Specific-localised radio stations

Television channels 
RTM offers six terrestrial TV channels in Malaysia. While Malay and English are main languages used for its programmes, three out of six channels also offer vernacular language programmes for its non-Malay native population (widely known as Bumiputera), as well as Chinese and Indian minorities.

Over-the-top media service 

RTM Klik (formerly MyKlik and RTM Mobile) is RTM's Over-the-top media service (OTT). It covers viewers across multiple devices such as computers, tablets, smartphones. The service's website contains all RTM television channels and radio stations, as well as online streaming channel RTM Parlimen which was launched on 1 July 2013.

RTM Parlimen broadcasts the parliamentary session from Monday to Thursday from 10 am to 1 pm in the morning session and from 2.30 pm to 5.30 pm or late in the afternoon/evening session. Apart from RTM Klik, RTM Parlimen can also be watched through the RTM Parlimen page channel.

See also 
 List of television stations in Malaysia
 List of Malay language television channels
 List of radio stations in Malaysia
 Mass media in Malaysia
 Television in Malaysia
 Mediacorp

References

External links 

  
 RTM's former web address

 
Publicly funded broadcasters
Television in Malaysia
Mass media companies of Malaysia
Multilingual broadcasters
Government-owned companies of Malaysia
State media
Ministry of Communications and Multimedia (Malaysia)